Graiguenamanagh or Graignamanagh is a town on the River Barrow in County Kilkenny, Ireland. Part of the settlement, known as Tinnahinch, is on the County Carlow side of the river, and Carlow County Council refers to the whole village as "Graiguenamanagh-Tinnahinch". Also combined for census purposes, as of the 2016 census, Graiguenamanagh-Tinnahinch had a population of 1,475 people.

Graiguenamanagh is located at the foot of Brandon Hill and is home to Duiske Abbey, the largest of the thirty-four mediaeval Cistercian abbeys in Ireland.

History

Ecclesiastical sites
Evidence of ancient settlement in the area include ecclesiastical enclosure and holy well sites in the townlands of Graiguenamanagh and Tinnahinch.

Also located in the area are the ruined remains of the early Christian church of Ullard, founded by Saint Fiachra in the seventh century. Several miles downstream from Graiguenamanagh are the ruins of an ancient monastic establishment at St Mullin's.

Duiske Abbey 

Based on an earlier settlement, much of Graiguenamanagh developed around the early 13th-century Duiske Abbey. The abbey, which takes its name from the river Duiske (Blackwater) which joins the Barrow here, was founded by William Marshall in 1204 and was suppressed by Henry VIII in 1536. Some remains of the monastery exist to the rear of the houses that line the east side of Lower Main Street. 

The abbey's large "Early English" gothic church was restored in the 1980s, and it is now the Catholic parish church in Graiguenamanagh. In its northern aisle is a model which shows the monastery as it was in the fourteenth century.

Economic development 
The River Barrow, historically a transport route, was developed as a commercial navigation during the 18th century. Graiguenamanagh Bridge, a seven-arched limestone bridge spanning the River Barrow, was built in 1764. 

Graiguenamanagh served as a base for commercial barges operating on the river until barge traffic ceased in 1959. These barges were later replaced by pleasure craft.

Public transport
The town is located on the R705 regional road. Kilbride Coaches operate a route linking it to Kilkenny via Gowran.

Recreation and culture

Walking, cycling the Barrow towpath, and watersports are among the more common activities in the Graiguenamanagh area. The Barrow's aquatic facilities include fishing, swimming, kayaking, and canoeing. The town is also home to a rowing club, a canoe club, an athletics club, the GAA (hurling and Gaelic football), and a soccer club. The South Leinster Way, a long-distance trail, runs across the Barrow Valley and nearby Brandon Hill. 

There is a series of statues of monks in Graiguenamanagh, including several which depict the activities traditionally carried out by the Cistercian monks of Duiske Abbey. There is also a public library in the center of town, where a series of talks and lectures are sometimes held during the winter season. The Abbey Centre, beside the library, is home to an art gallery and a small museum.

See also 
 List of abbeys and priories in Ireland (County Kilkenny)
 List of towns and villages in Ireland
 Market Houses in Ireland

Further reading 
 'Graiguenamanagh:A Town and its People', John Joyce,(Graigue Publications,1993).
 'The Old Grey Mouse', Sean Swayne, (The Abbey Centre,1995).
 'Tinnahinch: A Village within a Town', Owen Doyle & Colm Walshe, (Graiguenamanagh Historical Society, 2003).
 'The O'Leary Footprint' (Philip E. Murphy and J. David Hughes eds), (The O'Leary Archive,2004).
 'Graiguenamanagh Families', Owen Doyle & Colm Walshe, (Graiguenamanagh Historical Society,2006).
 'Graiguenamanagh:A Varied Heritage', John Joyce, (Graiguenamanagh Historical Society, 2009).

References

External links

 Graiguenamanagh-Tinnahinch Joint Local Area Plan 2021 (Kilkenny and Carlow county councils) 

Towns and villages in County Kilkenny
Census towns in County Kilkenny